Malin Persson (born April 26, 1979, in Osby, Skåne, Sweden) is a fashion model from Sweden. Today, Persson  works as a full-time model, mainly in Paris, New York City and Milan. She lives in Rome with her husband Damiano Mazzarella and her son Tiago.

Modeling career
Persson has worked for designers such as Chanel, Karl Lagerfeld, Dior, Givenchy and Dolce & Gabbana. She has also been signed by agencies such as 1 Model Management, NEXT Models, and Mikas Stockholm. Persson has been seen in campaigns such as Chanel, ETRO, Paul Smith, Lagerfeld gallery, D&G, Shiseido, Malo,  etc. She  has worked on film projects such as Hot Dog, Puritan and Messages. Also she has functioned as a custom buyer, a custom assistant. She has opened a very successful bar "salotto42" in Rome where she now lives with her husband Damiano Mazzarella and 2 kids, Tiago (4) and Milo (2).

Persson is known from Scandinavia's Next Top Model, where she encourages Swedish girls to fulfil their modeling ambitions. Previously, Mini Anden was the host, but Persson replaced her due to criticism of Anden. She left and was replaced by Swedish model Vendela Kirsebom as a host for Cycle 4.

External links 
  
 

1979 births
Living people
Swedish female models